Rock Salt & Nails may refer to:

 "Rock Salt & Nails" a song written by Utah Phillips and covered by many artists
 Rock Salt & Nails (album), an album by Steve Young
 Rock Salt & Nails (band), a band from Shetland Islands, playing Celtic fusion music